The Solenzara is a small coastal river in the departments of Corse-du-Sud and Haute-Corse, Corsica, France.

Course

It crosses the communes of Quenza and Sari-Solenzara in Corse-du-Sud and Solaro in Haute-Corse.
The Solenzara rises to the southeast of the  Punta Bigornu and to the north of the village of Bavella in the commune of Quenza, Corse-du-Sud.
It flows northeast, paralleled by the D268 road.
For about half its length it forms the border between Corse-du-Sud and Haute-Corse. 
It enters the sea to the north of the town of Solenzara.

The river is popular with tourists, who come to enjoy bathing in the natural basins.

Hydrology

Measurements of the river flow were taken at the Sari-Solenzara [Canniciu] station from 1974 to 2021.

Tributaries
The following streams (ruisseaux) are tributaries of the Solenzara (ordered by length) and sub-tributaries:

 Marsolinu 
Fiumicelli 
Litichine 
Bujacone 
Ciuntrone 
Larone 
Gaglioli 
Padulella 
San Petru 
Purcaraccia 
Jallicu 
Ferriate 
Finosella 
Frasselli 
Cateraccia 
Buzzichellu 
Jallichellu 
Ciuffatu 
Utriolu 
Polischellu 
Vadina Francese 
Prunellu 
Scalzu 
Fossi 
Castellucciu 
Macchine 
Malaspina 
Plutone 
Olmiccia 
Petra Grossa 
Pampalone 
Trovone 
Quercitellu 
Buccarona 
Capannelle 
Nidicale 
Cannicciu 
Perellu

Notes

Sources

Rivers of Haute-Corse
Rivers of Corse-du-Sud
Rivers of France
Coastal basins of the Tyrrhenian Sea in Corsica